Walter Leslie Duncan (14 February 1883 – 28 May 1947) was an Australian politician. Born in Armidale, New South Wales, he was educated at state schools before becoming a clerk, and was President of the Labor Council of New South Wales in 1911. A member of the Labor Party, he joined the Nationalists in the wake of the 1916 split over conscription. Duncan enlisted in the military in 1917, leaving in 1919 to successfully contest the Senate for the Nationalists. A strong supporter of Billy Hughes, he was excluded from the party along with Hughes in 1929 and joined the Australian Party, before being reaccepted into the United Australia Party in 1931. He resigned from the Senate in 1931.

Personal life
Duncan married three times and had four children. His first wife Ellen Cousins Riley was the daughter of Edward Riley and the sister of Edward Charles Riley, both of whom were federal Labor MPs. They married in 1910 and had three sons, but she died in 1922. Duncan re-married the following year to Kathleen Flemming, a bank clerk, with whom he subsequently had a daughter. He was widowed a second time in 1941 and re-married in 1946 to Eileen Coutman. He died of pneumonia and nephritis on 28 May 1947 in West Tamworth, New South Wales.

References

Nationalist Party of Australia members of the Parliament of Australia
Members of the Australian Senate for New South Wales
Members of the Australian Senate
1883 births
1947 deaths
Independent members of the Parliament of Australia
Australian Party members of the Parliament of Australia
United Australia Party members of the Parliament of Australia
20th-century Australian politicians